Krishna district is located in the Coastal Andhra region of the state of the Indian state of Andhra Pradesh. The villages in the district are administered in 50 mandals.

Mandal wise villages 

 census of India, the following are the villages in their respective mandals of Krishna district.

Source:Census India 2011 (sub districts)

Note:
 The villages data in the list is as per the 2011 census of India. All other villages and hamlets are not included.
 Vijayawada (urban) is a mandal which is completely under the urban body of Vijayawada municipal corporation and hence do not have any villages.

A

B

C

G

I

J

K

M

N

P

R

T

U

V

See also 
List of villages in Guntur district

References 

Krishna villages
 
Krishna district